The Ministry of Science and Technology Development is a government ministry, responsible for science and technology in Zimbabwe. The incumbent is Henry Dzinotyiwei. Its oversees the Scientific and Industrial Research and Development Centre.

References

Government of Zimbabwe
Zimbabwe